This article lists records for stolen bases within Major League Baseball (MLB). For individual players, leaders in stolen bases for a career, single season, and single game are provided, along with leaders in stolen base percentage for a single season and career. Team records for stolen bases in a single season are also provided.

Stolen bases were not officially noted in a baseball game's summary until 1886, and it was not until 1888 that it officially earned a place in baseball's box score.  The modern rule for stolen bases was adopted in 1898.  While some sources do not include stolen base records before 1898—because they are difficult to compare to the era after 1898—as the sourcing on the below list indicates, Major League Baseball continues to recognize them.

Individual records

Career stolen base leaders

Source:

Entering the 2022 MLB season, only three active players have 300 or more career stolen bases: Dee Strange-Gordon, Elvis Andrus, and Billy Hamilton.

Career stolen bases leaders, top 10 by league

Single-season stolen base leaders (100 or more)

The pre-modern single-season mark for stolen bases is 138 by Hugh Nicol of the Cincinnati Red Stockings (AA) in 1887
. In the modern era, Ty Cobb set a single-season mark of 96 stolen bases in 1915 that lasted until it was broken by Maury Wills with 104 in 1962.  A new modern mark was set by Lou Brock with 118 in 1974, and again by Rickey Henderson with 130 in 1982.  Henderson and Vince Coleman are the only players to record three 100-steal seasons in the modern era.  Coleman is the only player to do it three seasons in a row, much less in the first three season of his career, as well as the only player to record 100 steals as a rookie.

 denotes a player's rookie season

Single-game stolen base leaders (5 or more)

Under the pre-modern rule, George Gore stole 7 bases in a game in 1881, a mark that was tied by "Sliding Billy" Hamilton in 1894.  In the modern era, Eddie Collins stole 6 bases in a game on two occasions, both in September 1912, a mark that stood alone for nearly eight decades before being tied by Otis Nixon (1991), Eric Young (1996), and Carl Crawford (2009).

Consecutive stolen base leaders (35 or more)

Records for consecutive successful stolen base attempts are limited by the available data, as times caught stealing has been recorded officially only since 1920. Max Carey established a mark in 1922–23 of 36 consecutive stolen bases without being caught, which stood until it was broken by Davey Lopes with 38 consecutive steals in 1975. Lopes's record was broken by Vince Coleman with 50 consecutive stolen bases in 1988–89.

Multiple-season stolen base records

Three or more seasons with 70 stolen bases
Under pre-modern rules, "Sliding Billy" Hamilton amassed six separate seasons of 70-plus stolen bases over his career.  In the modern era, Ty Cobb established a mark of three such seasons that stood (though tied by Lou Brock and Omar Moreno) until it was broken by Tim Raines in 1984.  In 1986, Raines reached six seasons of 70-plus steals, all consecutive (a record), but Rickey Henderson notched his seventh such season in 1989.

Ten or more seasons with 40 stolen bases
In 1924, Eddie Collins tied Billy Hamilton's pre-modern mark of ten seasons with 40-plus stolen bases.  A year later, Max Carey also tied the record.  The record was broken by Lou Brock in 1974.  Brock eventually recorded a thirteenth 40-steal season, but was in turn surpassed by Rickey Henderson in 1993.  Henderson eventually stole 40 bases in sixteen separate seasons.

Eight or more consecutive seasons with 40 stolen bases

Fifteen or more seasons with 20 stolen bases

League-leader stolen base records

League leader in stolen bases, 5 or more seasons

League leader in stolen bases, 4 or more consecutive seasons

League leader in stolen bases, two leagues

League leader in stolen bases, three different teams

Stolen base percentage leaders

Career leaders (80% or more, 400+ attempts)
Those marked in bold have at least 600 career stolen base attempts.  Of those, Joe Morgan (in 1984) was the first to retire with a career stolen base percentage of at least 80%.  His mark was successively surpassed by Davey Lopes (retired 1987), Willie Wilson (retired 1994), and Tim Raines (retired 2002).

Single-season leaders (95% or more, 30+ steals)

Note: includes all statistics from both leagues for players traded during a season.

Team records
Tables in this section indicate which MLB-recognized league each team played in.

Most stolen bases by a team in one season, by league

While not recognized as a major league by MLB, the National Association (NA) operated from 1871 through 1875, with the 1873 Boston Red Stockings amassing the most stolen bases in a single season, 145.

Most stolen bases by a team in one season (450 or more)

Records in this category are dominated by teams of the American Association, which operated from 1882 to 1891, and whose records are recognized by Major League Baseball. In particular, the top four entries in the below table are from the league's 1887 season, when every team in league had at least 305 stolen bases and the league average was 458 (each team played between 133 and 141 games).

Source:

Most stolen bases by a team in one season, 1901–present (300 or more)

The below table is restricted to teams that have competed since , the first season of play for the American League.

Source:

Fewest stolen bases by a team in one season (less than 20)

Note: this table excludes teams from the shortened  season.

Source:

See also

 30–30 club – players who have hit 30 home runs and stolen 30 bases in the same season
 Lists of Major League Baseball stolen base leaders

Notes

References

Major League Baseball records
Major League Baseball lists